Jack Thorne FRSL (born 6 December 1978) is a British playwright, television writer, screenwriter, and producer.

He is best known for writing the stage play Harry Potter and the Cursed Child, the films Wonder and Enola Holmes, and the television programme His Dark Materials.

Early life
Thorne was born in Bristol on 6 December 1978. He was educated at St. Bartholomew's School in Newbury, Berkshire, and matriculated in 1998 at Pembroke College, Cambridge. He was forced to "degrade" (drop out to return at a later date) due to ill health in his third year, but returned to finish his studies and graduated with lower second-class honours in 2002.

Career

Theatre 
Thorne's plays for stage include When You Cure Me (Bush Theatre 2005), Fanny and Faggot (Edinburgh Festival Fringe  2004, Finborough Theatre and tour, 2007), Stacy (Arcola Theatre and Trafalgar Studios, 2007), Burying Your Brother in the Pavement (Royal National Theatre Connections Festival 2008), 2 May 1997 (Bush Theatre 2009), Bunny (Underbelly and tour 2010) which won a Fringe First at the 2010 Edinburgh Festival and Hope (Royal Court Theatre, 2014). He also collaborated on Greenland (2011) with Moira Buffini, Penelope Skinner and Matt Charman at the National Theatre. In 2011 he participated in the Bush Theatre's project Sixty Six Books, for which he wrote a piece based upon a book of the King James Bible. In 2012 his version of Friedrich Duerrenmatt's The Physicists was staged at the Donmar Warehouse.

His 2013 adaptation of the book and film Let The Right One In was staged in a production by the National Theatre of Scotland at Dundee Rep Theatre, London's Royal Court Theatre, West End and New York's St. Ann's Warehouse. In summer 2015, his play The Solid Life of Sugar Water premiered at the Edinburgh Festival Fringe, produced by Graeae Theatre Company and Theatre Royal Plymouth, it then toured in early 2016, with a run at the National Theatre in March 2016. Together with the composer Stephen Warbeck, Thorne wrote Junkyard, a coming-of-age musical centred around 'The Vench', an Adventure playground in Lockleaze, Bristol.

Thorne wrote the stage play Harry Potter and the Cursed Child, based on an original story by Thorne, J.K. Rowling and John Tiffany, which is running at the Palace Theatre in London's West End since August 2016, on Broadway at the Lyric Theatre since April 2018, in Melbourne's Princess Theatre since February 2019 and San Francisco's Curran Theatre since December 2019. Thorne also wrote a new adaptation of Woyzeck by Georg Büchner for the Old Vic in 2017 with John Boyega in the title role. He wrote a new adaptation of A Christmas Carol by Charles Dickens for the Old Vic for the Christmas 2017 season, directed by Matthew Warchus, which has subsequently returned for the 2018 and 2019 seasons, as well as the 2019 season on Broadway at the Lyceum Theatre and the 2020 live broadcast through Old Vic: On Camera due to the COVID-19 pandemic. It is due to return for the 2020 season at both The Old Vic and on Broadway (theatre and details to be confirmed). Thorne rewrote the musical adaptation of King Kong for its 2018 Broadway debut. Thorne penned the play the end of history for Royal Court Theatre in 2019, starring David Morrissey and Lesley Sharp. Thorne's play Sunday premiered at Atlantic Theatre Company in New York in 2019, directed by Lee Sunday Evans. In June 2021, his adaptation of After Life based on the film of the same name opened at the National Theatre, London.

His plays are published by Nick Hern Books.

Television
Thorne has written for the TV shows Skins and Shameless. He co-created Cast-offs, and has co-written This Is England '86, This Is England '88,  This Is England '90 and The Virtues with Shane Meadows. Thorne was also in the running to write an episode for the fifth series of Doctor Who, but amicably parted ways with the production. In August 2010, BBC Three announced Thorne would be writing a 60-minute, six episode supernatural drama for the channel called Touch, later re-titled The Fades. In 2012, he won BAFTA awards for both drama series (The Fades) and serial (This Is England '88). In 2014, Thorne's original rural teen murder drama Glue premiered on E4 and the show was nominated Best Multichannel Programme and the 2015 Broadcast Awards. In autumn of 2015 This Is England '90 transmitted on Channel 4 and earned Thorne a Best Series Award at the Jameson Empire Awards 2016 and the BAFTA for Best-Mini Series in 2016. Next, the pan-European diamond heist thriller for Sky Atlantic The Last Panthers, which aired in the UK in September 2015 was BAFTA nominated for Best Drama Series. To round up a hat-trick of nominations at the 2016 BAFTA TV Awards, Thorne's BBC 3 drama Don't Take My Baby was nominated and went on to win the BAFTA for Best Single Drama. Thorne's Channel 4 drama National Treasure started on 20 September 2016 and won the BAFTA for Best Mini-Series in 2017.

In April 2016 it was announced that Thorne would be adapting Philip Pullman's epic trilogy His Dark Materials for BBC One. In 2017, it was announced that he would write an episode of the Channel 4/Amazon Video series Philip K. Dick's Electric Dreams and would write the Damien Chazelle musical drama Netflix series The Eddy. Thorne's four-part dark drama Kiri began on Channel Four on 10 January 2018 and was nominated for Best Mini Series at the 2019 BAFTA's. His Channel Four show The Accident began on 24 October 2019 and starred Sarah Lancashire.

In 2021, Thorne wrote the television film Help. Set and filmed in Liverpool, Help focused on the plight of disabled people and their carers during the COVID-19 pandemic in the UK and addressed the multitude of ways in which Boris Johnson's government had failed them. It was acclaimed by critics, with Carol Midgley of The Times calling it "a shaming nightmare [that] all ministers should see", and won Best Drama at the 2021 Rose d'Or Awards.

In 2022, Thorne co-wrote Then Barbara Met Alan with Genevieve Barr, the true story of Barbara Lisicki and Alan Holdsworth, the founders of DAN (Disabled People's Direct Action Network). It tells the story of two disabled cabaret performers who meet at a gig in 1989, fall in love and, driven by their own experiences and the experiences of those around them of discrimination, mistreatment, and the realities of living in an ableist society, lead protests nationwide, eventually leading to the passing of the Disability Discrimination Act 1995. Then Barbara Met Alan was received to both popular and critical acclaim, with Frances Ryan of The Guardian saying "By the time the real-life Barbara was on screen in the final scene – with a ramp symbolically coming out of a bus to finally give her entry – I was crying. For what we gained. For what was taken from us for decades, and still is. For the campaigners who gave so much for my generation and those that do today. Roar in the streets and kiss your lover. This is what disability looks like – and the battle continues."

Radio
Thorne has written four plays for radio; an adaptation of When You Cure Me (BBC Radio 3, 2006), Left at the Angel (BBC Radio 4, 2007), an adaptation of The Hunchback of Notre Dame (co-written with Alex Bulmer, BBC Radio 4, 2009) and People Snogging in Public Places (BBC Radio 3, 2009). The latter won him the Sony Radio Academy Awards Gold for Best Drama 2010. The judges described it "as a wonderfully written and performed, highly original piece of radio drama in which the production perfectly mirrored the subject. Painful and funny, it was a bold exciting listen." A Summer Night (BBC Radio 3, 2011) was Thorne's response to the 2011 London riots, transmitted live as part of the Free Thinking festival.

In 2012, People Snogging in Public Places was produced and broadcast by France-Culture (in the Fictions / Drôles de drames slot) under the French title of Regarder passer les trains (translator: Jacqueline Chnéour).

Film
Thorne's first film The Scouting Book for Boys was released in 2009, it won him Best Newcomer at the London Film Festival. The jury said, "Jack Thorne is a poetic writer with an end-of-the-world imagination and a real gift for story-telling.". Thorne has been commissioned to write feature films for producers both sides of the Atlantic, with credits including War Book starring Sophie Okonedo which Tom Harper directed, and A Long Way Down starring Pierce Brosnan, Toni Collette and Aaron Paul (directed by Pascal Chaumeil) based on the novel by Nick Hornby.

On 8 May 2013, Thorne was hired to adapt the film adaptation of Wonder; a 2012 novel of the same name by R.J. Palacio. Thorne co-wrote the script with Steve Conrad and Stephen Chbosky. The latter directed the film, which starred Julia Roberts, Owen Wilson, and Jacob Tremblay and was released on 17 November 2017. On 2 August 2017, it was announced he would rewrite the script for Star Wars: The Rise of Skywalker, but on 12 September 2017, he was replaced by J. J. Abrams and Chris Terrio. In 2018, it was announced that he will rewrite the initial screenplay penned by Chris Weitz for Disney's live-action adaptation of Pinocchio, directed by Paul King.

Thorne also co-wrote the 2019 film The Aeronauts with Tom Harper for Amazon Studios, starring Felicity Jones and Eddie Redmayne.  Although Amazon does not release exact streaming figures, Jennifer Salke, Head of Amazon Studios said in an interview with Deadline Hollywood that as of January 2020 The Aeronauts was the most viewed movie of all time on Amazon Prime.

Thorne's 2020 screenplays include Radioactive, a biographical drama about Marie Curie, starring Rosamund Pike; The Secret Garden, an adaptation of the novel of the same name; and Enola Holmes, about the sister of Sherlock Holmes, starring Millie Bobby Brown and Helena Bonham Carter.

Campaigning and advocacy 
Thorne has been a long-term advocate for the disabled community in the dramatic arts. After he developed cholinergic urticaria when he was 20 years old, he became allergic to outdoor heat, artificial heat, and his own body heat. This gave him chronic pain that forced him to leave university and spend much of his early twenties in bed. Despite this, he felt unsure whether he could identify as a disabled person; after attending a Graeae Theatre Company open day (which he described as the "National Theatre of disability") three years after his diagnosis, he was accepted with open arms. He described the incident as a "coming out moment" and a "crucial part" of who he is. He has since written disabled dramas The Hunchback of Notre Dame, The Spastic King, Cast Offs, The Solid Life of Sugar Water, Don't Take My Baby, and CripTales, and has become a patron of the Graeae Theatre Company.

In August 2021, Thorne delivered the Edinburgh TV Festival's prestigious MacTaggart Lecture. He used the speech to discuss television's power as an "empathy box" in the living room of millions and its failings for neglecting a large and vibrant part of the populace by poorly representing the disabled community. Thorne points to the great suffering of disabled people during the COVID-19 pandemic in which the media rendered huge amounts of unnecessary deaths acceptable through usage of the term "underlying health condition". The speech also outlined how television industry practice has been discriminatory towards disabled artists, and the dire need for the industry to commit to change, both off-screen and on; alongside Genevieve Barr and Katie Player, Thorne announced a pressure group called Underlying Health Condition which aims to elevate disabled voices in the industry. Thorne argues that more disabled stories written by disabled people and performed by disabled people would make visible what's invisible in the "empathy box" in the homes of the public and cause change to happen.

On 3 December 2021, Underlying Health Condition was launched at an event at the Tate Modern, collaborating with other disability organisations such as Disabled Artists Networking Community, the Creative Diversity Network and 1in4 Coalition, to propose a series of requirements and measures to accommodate and support disabled artists in television.

Personal life
Thorne is married to Rachel Mason. They have one son, Elliott, who was named after the human protagonist of E.T. the Extra-Terrestrial. His wife's sister is married to comedian Frank Skinner, making him Skinner's brother-in-law.

In 2023, Thorne revealed he had been diagnosed as being autistic. He was inspired to seek diagnosis following a question on Desert Island Discs.

Filmography

Film

Short films

Television series 

TV movies

Awards

References

External links

Jack Thorne at the London Theatre Database
'Are we there yet?' Jack Thorne on writing Cast-offs, Independent, 22 November 2009
Jack Thorne on The Scouting Book For Boys, Film4.com, March 2010
Interview and Podcast with The Writers' Guild of Great Britain, writersguildofgreatbritain.co.uk, August 2010
Jack Thorne Column On Adapting Let The Right One In for the West End stage. puremovies.co.uk, April 2014

1978 births
Living people
Writers from Bristol
British television writers
English television writers
English screenwriters
English male screenwriters
English dramatists and playwrights
English male dramatists and playwrights
British male television writers
Alumni of Pembroke College, Cambridge
British disability rights activists